Cognac Croizet is a cognac producer based in St Même Les Carrieres in the Cognac Region of France. The company has two main offices in France and in Hong Kong.

History
The Cognac region in France is divided into six districts, with the Grande Champagne district being the most prestigious as the course of grapes grown for cognac. Leon Croizet established his Cognac House in the Grande Champagne Region in 1805. Prior to that he was sommelier to Napoleon I's (Bonaparte) High Command. Croizet is one of three vintage cognac houses that has continuously sold single vintage cognacs.

The Croizet family has been making wines since the 16th century and their coat of arms which is found on all its bottles can still be seen all over St Même in buildings such as the town church. The Croizet emblem comes from the church of St Même les Carrières.

It can be found on the keystone of the 12th-century church and is the combination of 2 emblems, one of which is the coat of arms of the de Culant – Alexandre de Culant who was lord of St Même. This double emblem is topped by a final crown and carries the wordings "FPMG BOVNEAU 1731" (Done By Me Guillaume Bonneau). Guillaume Bonneau is the stone cutter who worked on the construction of the church in the town in 1731.

The brand is associated with successfully combating the Phylloxera disease, which eliminated all the vineyards in the Bordeaux region, thus greatly impoverishing wine and cognac production. However, in 1883, Leon Croizet's grandson - Benjamin Leon Croizet, replanted American vines, in place of the diseased French ones, and surrounded these by stone walls. This technique overcame the Phylloxera disease, for which Benjamin Leon Croizet was honored with the Légion d'honneur. More recently in the San Francisco World Spirit Competition Croizet won double gold medals for its XO in both 2004/5. In 2015 Croizet's XO again won Double Gold for the best XO Cognac in the San Francisco World Spirit Competition.

Some of Croizet's bottles date back to the early 19th Century such as Cuvee Leonie.

On 24 September 2011 a single bottle of Cognac Croizet dating back to the single harvest of 1858 (Cuvee Leonie) was sold at auction in Shanghai, China for 1 million yuan (approx. $156,760). This cognac is recognized by the Guinness Book of Records as the most expensive cognac sold at auction. According to the World's Best Bartender's Guide by Joseph Scott it says on page 46 that "Winston Churchill and General Eisenhower plotted the allies victory in World War 2 over an 1858 Croizet that had been secreted out of France by the French Underground."

This cognac is also known as a comet vintage for which Croizet holds a number of. Comet vintages are years during which an astronomical event, involving generally a "Great Comet", occurs prior to harvest. Throughout the history of wine, winemakers have attributed successful vintages and ideal weather conditions to the unexplained effects caused by the comets.

Since the auction some private collectors of cognac have announced plans to sell their  collection. Bay Van Der Bunt of the Old Liquor Company has stated his intention to sell his cognac collection for 5 million British Pounds, he told the media that his most prized cognac is an 1842 Croizet.

Cognac Croizet's famous 1858 cognac, Cuvée Leonie was recently the main base used to make the world's most expensive cocktail, The Winston which is now 
recognized by the Guinness World Records as such.This cocktail was sold for 12,500 Australian Dollars in Melbourne, Australia at Club 23 on 7 February 2013 located in Crown's integrated resort.
 
Cognac Croizet is now recognized as a well known brand in mainland China and Asia due to the two Guinness World Records that Croizet Hong Kong has overseen since opening an office in the city in 2008. Jason Gillott and Alexander Shponko are the two Directors which have overseen this expansion.

Products
 Croizet VS
 Croizet VSOP
 Croizet XO
 Croizet EXTRA

Exclusive Cognacs (limited production)
 Single Vintage Cognacs
Légion d' Honneur 1883
Exposition Universelle 1889
 Cuvee Leonie dating back to the single harvest of 1858
 Cuvee 989

Sources
http://cognacs.wordpress.com/
http://cognacs.wordpress.com/2010/06/05/b-leon-croizet-cognac-region-was-ravaged-by-phylloxera-in-late-19th-century-and-croizet-developed-techniques-that-replanted-cognac-video/
https://web.archive.org/web/20120325073931/http://cognacwiki.com/croizet-brand-information/
http://cognacs.wordpress.com/2010/06/10/cognac-croizet-distillery-the-archive-room

References

External links 
Official website English, Cantonese and Mandarin Chinese.
Cognac Croizet on youku

Cognac
French distillers